The Four Nations Tournament (Portuguese: Torneio Quatro Nações) is a friendly Handball competition held every Year since 2014 in Brazil organised by the Brazilian Handball Confederation.

Men's tournament

Summary

Participating nations

Women's tournament

Summary

Participating nations

References

External links
 www.brasilhandebol.com.br

 
International handball competitions
Recurring sporting events established in 2014